The fourth edition of Liège–Bastogne–Liège for Women, a road cycling one-day race in Belgium, was held on 4 October 2020. It was originally planned to be held on 26 April, but was cancelled and rescheduled due to the COVID-19 pandemic. It was the seventh event of the shortened 2020 UCI Women's World Tour.

Route
Similar to the 2019 edition, the race finished in Liège. At , the race was approximately half the distance of the men's event. It started in Bastogne, from where it headed north to finish in Liège on the same location as the men's race. The route featured five categorised climbs: the Côte de Wanne, Côte de la Haute-Levée, Côte de la Vecquée, Côte de La Redoute, and Côte de la Roche aux faucons.

Teams
Eight UCI Women's WorldTeams and sixteen UCI Women's Continental Teams competed in the race. Of these 137 riders, 56 finished the race.

UCI Women's WorldTeams

 
 
 
 
 
 
 
 

UCI Women's Continental Teams

Result

UCI World Tour

References

2020 UCI Women's World Tour
2020 in Belgian sport
2020
October 2020 sports events in Belgium
Cycling events postponed due to the COVID-19 pandemic